This is a list of Monuments in Kathmandu Metropolis -2, officially recognized by and available through the website of the Department of Archaeology, Nepal in the Kathmandu District. Kathmandu is historically rich city. Hindu temples are the main attraction of this Metropolis.

List of Monuments

|}

See also 
 List of Monuments in Bagmati Zone
 List of Monuments in Nepal

References

External links

Metropolis 02
Kathmandu-related lists